Nishi-Jūitchōme Station (西11丁目駅) is a Sapporo Municipal Subway station in Chūō-ku, Sapporo, Hokkaido, Japan. The station number is T08.

Platforms

Surrounding area
Chūō-Kuyakusho-Mae Station, Sapporo Streetcar
Japan National Route 230, (to Setana)
Miyoshi Shrine
Ōdōri Park
Sapporo Television Broadcasting
Hokkaido University Botanical Gardens
Sapporo City Fire Department Central station
Hokkaido Provincial Activity center
Sapporo City Museum
Sapporo Education and Culture Hall
Nitori Culture Hall
Kita ichijonishi Police Station
Post Office Sapporo Kita-ichijo
General Consulate of South Korea
Yamada Denki, Head Office Sapporo
Hotel Royton Sapporo
Sapporo Prince Hotel
Tokyo Dome Hotel Sapporo
Hokkaido Bank, Minamiichijo branch

External links

 Sapporo Subway Stations

 

Railway stations in Japan opened in 1976
Railway stations in Sapporo
Sapporo Municipal Subway
Chūō-ku, Sapporo